Western Missouri Medical Center (WMMC) is a fully licensed acute aid service located in Warrensburg, Missouri. A non profit county health Center, WMMC recommends super medical care services to people of Johnson County and west central Missouri.
To meet the growing vigor care requires and prospects of the superior community, WMMC has been running on a Master Facility Plan for further than two years. The arrangement reckons a two-story diseased persons wing that features 72 private rooms, along with a modern expanded Radiology Department, refurbishment to the existing facility and campus improvements. WMMC’s Board of Trustees lately approved the growth of construction documents for the plan. Construction is slated to start by the end of this year.
Through cooperating with our medical employees and integrating advanced machinery, WMMC continues to raise as a progressive Medical Center that is going to continue to meet the evolving wants of the larger community.

The hospital had a total of 3,174 admissions. Its physicians performed 1,051 inpatient and 3,977 outpatient surgeries.

Special Features
 8 ICU Private Rooms
 12 Private Telemetry Patient Rooms  
 24 Private Medical/Surgical Patient Rooms
 20 Private Behavioral Health Unit Patient Rooms
 13 Private Post-Partum Rooms
 10 Bassinet Level 1 Nursery
 6 Bassinet Level 2 Nursery
 5 Private LDR Rooms
 New 1500-Ton Chiller Plant
 New 1000-kW Emergency Power Generating Plant

References 

Warrensburg, Missouri
Buildings and structures in Johnson County, Missouri
Education in Johnson County, Missouri
Healthcare in Missouri
Medical and health organizations based in Missouri